In linguistic semantics, an expression X is said to have cumulative reference if and only if the following holds:  If X is true of both of a and b, then it is also true of the combination of a and b.  Example:  If two separate entities can be said to be "water", then combining them into one entity will yield more "water". If two separate entities can be said to be "a house", their combination cannot be said to be "a house".  Hence, "water" has cumulative reference, while the expression  "a house" does not. The plural form "houses", however, does have cumulative reference.  If two (groups of) entities are both "houses", then their combination will still be "houses".

Cumulativity has proven relevant to the linguistic treatment of the mass/count distinction and for the characterization of grammatical telicity.

In later work, Krifka has generalized the notion to n-ary predicates, based on the phenomenon of cumulative quantification.  For example, the two following sentences appear to be equivalent:
 John ate an apple and Mary ate a pear.
 John and Mary ate an apple and a pear.

This shows that the relation "eat" is cumulative. In general, an n-ary predicate R is cumulative if and only if the following holds:

References

Krifka, Manfred (1989). "Nominal reference, temporal constitution and quantification in event semantics".
In Renate Bartsch, Johan van Benthem and Peter van Emde Boas (eds.), Semantics and Contextual Expressions 75–115. Dordrecht: Foris.

Krifka, Manfred. 1999. "At least some determiners aren’t determiners". In The semantics/pragmatics interface from different points of view, ed. K. Turner, 257–291. North-Holland: Elsevier Science.

Scha, Remko. 1981. "Distributive, collective, and cumulative quantification". In Formal methods in the study of language, ed. T. Janssen and M. Stokhof, 483–512. Amsterdam: Mathematical Centre Tracts.

Grammar
Semantics
Formal semantics (natural language)